Ever Green High School is a school in Dima Hasao district of Assam, affiliated with the SEBA.  It is a co-educational school located in Damadi Hawar, at the central place of Maibang town. The school has produced successful individuals who have carried on for higher studies in renowned institutions like Indian Institute of Technology, Indian Institute of Management, National Institute of Technology, Indian Institute of Information Technology, Indian Institute of Science, Assam Medical College, Gauhati Medical College and Hospital, Jorhat Engineering College and Assam Engineering College.

Establishment 
The school was established on 2 February 1990 with the aim of developing the locality of the Maibang area by the managing committee. The school then had only one permanent teacher.

References

External links
http://allindiafacts.com/school/assam/dima-hasao/maibang/18200625302.html
http://studyinfo.in/assam/dima-hasao/maibang/18200625302.html

High schools and secondary schools in Assam
Dima Hasao district
1990 establishments in Assam
Educational institutions established in 1990